Below is a partial list of TV specials that were previously aired and scheduled to be aired on GMA Network. For the currently aired shows of the network, please see the list of programs broadcast by GMA Network.

Previously aired specials

Election coverage specials

 Election '69: The Making Of The Philippine President (November  11–12, 1969 with DZTV-TV 13 and DZTM-TV 5)
 Decision '78 (April 7–8, 1978)
 Decision '80 (January 30–31, 1980)
 Decision '81 (June 16–17, 1981)
 Decision '84 (May 14–15, 1984)
 Decision '86 (February 7–8, 1986)
 Decision '87 (May 11–12, 1987)
 Decision '88 (January 18–19, 1988)
 Decision '92 (May 11–12, 1992)
 Decision '95: Operation Bantay Boto (May 8–9, 1995)
 Decision '98 (May 11–12, 1998)
 Eleksyon 2001 (May 14–15, 2001)
 Eleksyon 2004 (May 10–11, 2004)
 Eleksyon 2007 (May 14–15, 2007)
 Eleksyon 2010 (May 10–11, 2010)
 E13: Eleksyon 2013 (May 13–14, 2013)
 E16: Eleksyon 2016 (May 9–10, 2016)
 E19: Eleksyon 2019 (May 13–14, 2019)
 E22: Eleksyon 2022 (May 9–10, 2022)

Sports coverage specials
 Ang Bagong Hamon: The Pacquiao-Rios Fight Primer¹ (November 24, 2013)
 Affirmation: The Donaire-Maldonado Fight¹ (December 2, 2007)
 Battle for Greatness: Pacquiao vs. Mayweather¹ (May 3, 2015)
 Blaze of Glory: The Pacquiao–Solís Fight¹ (April 15, 2007)
 Day of Glory: The Donaire-Dorchinyan Fight¹ (July 8, 2007)
 Duel at the Dome: Dodie Boy Penalosa vs. Chang-Ho Choi (September 5, 1987)
 Fight of Champions: Manny Pacquiao vs. Lucas Matthysse (July 15, 2018)
 Firepower: Pacquiao vs. Cotto Fight¹ (November 15, 2009)
 GMA Knockout Sundays: (2010–2011, 2013–2014)
 Laban ng Lahi: Ana Julaton vs Yesica Marcos (March 18, 2012)
 Laban ng Lahi: Bagyo Sa Mexico: Ana Julaton vs. Jessica Villafranca¹ (October 2, 2011)
 Laban ng Lahi: Brian Viloria vs Hernan Marquez (November 18, 2012)
 Laban ng Lahi: Donnie Nietes vs. Mario Rodriguez Fight¹ (August 15, 2010)
 Laban ng Lahi: Denver Cuello vs. Muhammad Rachman Fight¹ (September 26, 2010)
 Laban ng Lahi: Denver Cuello vs. Samat Chaiyong Fight¹ (March 27, 2011)
 Laban ng Lahi: Dugong Kampeon: Dodie Boy Peñalosa vs. Kong Kiatpracha Gym¹ (August 6, 2011)
 Laban ng Lahi: Island Assault: Viloria vs Romero Fight¹ (May 6, 2012)
 Laban ng Lahi: Island Assault: Viloria vs Segura Fight¹ (December 11, 2011)
 Laban ng Lahi: Johnreil Casimero vs. Raul Hirales Fight¹ (July 25, 2010)
 Laban ng Lahi: Tapatan ng Tapang: Johnriel Casimero vs Felipe Salguero Fight (October 26, 2013)
 Laban ng Lahi: Dave Peñalosa vs. Alem Robles; Michael Farenas vs. Hector Velasquez (March 22, 2014)
 Game On: The Fight Of A Filipina Pride: Ana Julaton Vs. Lisa Brown Fight¹ (March 28. 2010)
 HBO 24/7 The Dream Match: Pacquiao Vs. De La Hoya Boxing TV Special¹ (December 7, 2008)
 HBO 24/7: Pacquiao Vs. Hatton Boxing TV Special¹ (May 2, 2009)
 HBO 24/7: Marquez vs. Bradley Boxing TV Special¹ (October 13, 2013)
 HBO 24/7 Firepower: Pacquiao vs. Cotto Boxing TV Special¹ (November 14, 2009)
 Hungry for Glory: Manny Pacquiao vs. Chris Algieri Fight¹ (November 23, 2014)
 Island Assault: Viloria-Iribe Fight¹ (August 30, 2009)
 Island Assault: Viloria-Romero Fight¹ (May 6, 2012)
 Island Assault: Viloria-Segura Fight¹ (December 11, 2011)
 Juan Manuel Marquez vs. Timothy Bradley Fight¹ (October 13, 2013)
 Laban Ng Pinay: Ana Julaton vs. Maria Villalobos Fight¹ (July 18, 2010)
 Lethal Combination: The Manny Pacquiao-David Diaz Fight¹ (June 29, 2008)
 Pacquiao: The Fighting Pride Of The Philippines Sports Documentary Special (May 1, 2011)
 Pacquiao Margarito Primer: Kasaysayan Karangalan (November 14, 2010)
 Pacquiao Vs. Clottey: How The West Was Won (March 28, 2010)
 Pacquiao Vs. Margarito Boxing Fight¹ (November 14, 2010)
 Pacquiao Vs. Marquez Boxing Fight¹ (November 13, 2011)
 Pacquiao Vs. Mosley Boxing Fight¹ (May 8, 2011)
 Manny Pacquiao vs. Timothy Bradley (June 10, 2012)
 Pacman Power Ang Alamat Ni Manny Pacquiao (November 13, 2010)
 NBA on GMA (1988–1996)
 NBA All-Star Game (1989–1996)
 NBA Finals (1989–1996)
 NBA Playoffs (1989–1996)
 NCAA Season 97 Men's Basketball Finals Letran Knights Vs. Mapua Cardinals (May 15-22, 2022)
 NCAA Season 98 Men's Basketball Finals Benilde Blazers Vs. Letran Knights (December 4-11-18, 2022)
 No One: Floyd Mayweather vs. Canelo Alvarez Fight (September 15, 2013)
 Pacquiao vs. Bradley III¹ (April 10, 2016)
 Pinoy Power 2: The Donaire-Concepcion Fight¹ (August 16, 2009)
 Pride & Glory: Philippines Vs. Mexico: The Sonsona-Hernandez Fight¹ (November 22, 2009)
 Resurgence: The Pacquiao-Vargas Fight¹ (November 6, 2016)
 Team Pacquiao: The GMA News & Public Affairs Sports Documentary Special (April 26, 2009)
 The Battle of Brisbane: Pacquiao vs. Horn (July 2, 2017)
 The Battle of East & West: Pacquiao Vs. Hatton Fight¹ (May 3, 2009)
 The Battle of Greatness: Pacquiao Vs. Mayweather¹ (May 3, 2015)
 The Clash in Cotai: Pacquiao Vs. Rios Boxing Fight¹ (November 24, 2013)
 The Dream Match: Pacquiao Vs. De La Hoya Fight¹ (December 7, 2008)
 The Event: Pacquiao Vs. Clottey Fight¹ (March 14, 2010)
 The Legend vs. The Olympian: Pacquiao Vs. Ugas Fight (August 22, 2021)
 The Flash & The Furious: Donaire-Martinez & Viloria-Solis Fight¹  (April 19, 2009)
 The One: Mayweather Vs. Alvarez Fight¹ (September 15, 2013) 
 Thrilla in Manila The Ali-Frazier Fight (October 1, 1975)
 Unfinished Business: The Pacquiao-Marquez Fight II¹ (March 16, 2008)
 Will to Win: The Manny Pacquiao VS. Marco Antonio Barrera II¹ (October 7, 2007)
 Who R U Picking?: The Mayweather-Mosley Fight¹ (May 2010)
 World Welterweight Championship: Pacquiao vs. Broner (January 20, 2019)
 Vengeance in Vegas: Manny Pacquiao vs. Timothy Bradley II Fight Primer¹ (April 13, 2014)
 Vindication: Manny Pacquiao vs. Timothy Bradley II Fight¹ (April 13, 2014)

¹in cooperation with Solar Sports

TV anniversary specials
 GMA World Class (1995)
 The GMA Story (documentary special, 1995)
 GMA Gold: The GMA 50th Anniversary Special (June 17, 2000)
 Very Very Happy Anniversary: GMA at 53 Anniversary Special (June 28–29, 2003)
 Kapuso @ 54: The GMA 54th Anniversary Special (2004)
 No. 1 @ 55: The GMA 55th Anniversary Special (June 26 and July 4, 2005)
 Fantastic 56: The GMA 56th Anniversary Special (July 9, 2006)
 Kapusolympics: The GMA 57th Anniversary Special (July 1, 2007)
 Kapusolympics Watermania: The GMA 58th Anniversary Special (June 22, 2008)
 Experience GMA Today & Beyond: 58 Glorious Years of Television (October 26, 2008)
 One Glamorous Night: Greater & Grateful @ 59: The GMA 59th Anniversary Special (June 28, 2009)
 GMA @ 60: The Heart of Television: The GMA 60th Anniversary Special (June 27, 2010)
 Thank You Kapuso: GMA Fans Day 2015: The GMA 65th Anniversary Special (July 26, 2015)

TV specials
 #Julie Concert TV Special (May 20, 2018)
 3 Days of Summer (May 7 and 14, 2017)
 7 para sa Filipino: Romi Garduce's 7th Summit Expedition (December 2011 – January 2012)
 14 Going Steady: Bubble Gang's 14th Anniversary Documentary Special (October 23, 2009)
 25 + 1: A Double Celebration (1988)
 20: Dalawampung Taon ng GMA Public Affairs (October 27, 2007)
 36th Metro Manila Film Festival Gabi ng Parangal (December 26, 2010)
 50 Years with the Master Showman: The Kuya Germs 50th Anniversary TV Special (April 27, 2013)
 61st FAMAS Awards (April 28, 2013)
 300 kilometers Ang Paglalakbay: The GMA News & Public Affairs Documentary Special (May 29, 2011)
 A Duet To Forever: The Ogie-Regine Wedding TV Special (December 26, 2010)
 A Handsome Journey: Richard Gutierrez Birthday Special (February 3, 2008)
 A Party for Every Juan: The Jose and Wally Concert (April 15, 2012)
 Agila 2 Launching TV Special (1997)
 Ai Am Who Ai Am: The Ai Ai de las Alas 25th Anniversary Concert Special (May 17, 2015)
 Alaala: A Martial Law Special (September 17, 2017)
 Alden Richards: Upsurge (July 23, 2017)
 Alden Richards: Adrenaline Rush (October 14, 2018)
 Amazing Cooking Kids Final Showdown TV Special (July 16, 2011)
 Amazing Love Story: Bong-Lani 25th Wedding Anniversary TV Special (June 5, 2011)
 American Idol Season 9 Grand Finals (May 27, 2010)
 American Music Awards TV Special (1974–1987)
 Amaya: The Making of an Epic Primer Special (May 28, 2011)
 Anak ng Bayan: A Katipunan Primer (October 12, 2013)
 Anak Ko Yan Grand Finals Showdown (2013)
 Anatomy of a Disaster (August 22, 2010, re-aired March 23, 2011)
 Anatomy of a Disaster: Ragasa ng Panganib (September 26, 2010, re-aired March 22, 2011)
 Anatomy of a Disaster: Bagsik ng Magma (October 31, 2010, re-aired March 25, 2011)
 Anatomy of a Disaster: Urban Inferno (November 14, 2010, re-aired March 24, 2011)
 Anatomy of a Disaster: Himagsik ng Kalikasan (January 23, 2011)
 Anatomy of a Disaster: Lagalag ng Kalikasan (February 20, 2011)
 Anatomy of a Disaster: Alerto Sa Pagyanig (March 21, 2011)
 Anatomy of a Disaster: Nag-aapoy na Unos (April 24, 2011)
 Anatomy of a Disaster: Ang Puot ng Karagatan (May 22, 2011)
 Anatomy of a Disaster: Superstorms (July 24, 2011)
 Anatomy of a Disaster: Raging Rivers (August 21, 2011)
 Anatomy of a Disaster: Landslides (September 25, 2011)
 Anatomy of a Disaster: Alerto sa Bagyo (November 6, 2011)
 Ang Ating Musika: Regine Velasquez Concert (2007)
 Ang Daigdig ni Diyesebel: Behind The Scenes Special (April 25, 2008)
 Ang Hatol: Guilty, The Chief Justice on Trial Special (June 3, 2012)
 Ang Inagurasyon: The GMA News and Public Affairs Special Coverage (June 30, 2022)
 Ang Pag-Iisang Dibdib nina Ralph at Vilma: The Ralph Recto & Vilma Santos Wedding Special (December 15, 1992)
 Ang Pagbabalik Ni Captain Barbel: The Making of Captain Barbell (May 29, 2006)
 Ang Pagbabalik Ni Darna: The Making of Darna (2005)
 Ang Susunod na Santo Papa: The GMA News Conclave Coverage (March 1–13, 2013)
 Ang People's Pope sa Pilipinas: The GMA News and Public Affairs Special Coverage (January 15–19, 2015)
 Are You the Next Big Star? Grand Finals Night (August 23, 2009)
 Asia Music Festival Philippines Grand Finals (1998)
 Bagyo ng Hulyo (July 9, 2004)
 Best Of Me: The Regine Velasquez Birthday Special (2008)
 Bert "Tawa" Marcelo Tribute TV Special (1995)
 Try Ko Lang Ha?: Betong's Amazing Concert (March 7, 2020)
 Blessed: The Beatification of John Paul II: A GMA News Special Coverage (May 1, 2011)
 Blessed by the Pope: The GMA News and Public Affairs Special (January 25, 2015)
 Billy Crawford's It's Time! Concert Telecast (October 21, 2007)
 Binibining Pilipinas Beauty Pageant (1982-1984, 1989–1994, 1998–2010)
 Binibining Pilipinas Beauty Pre-Pageant Night (1982-1984, 1989–1994, 1998–2010)
 Bitoy in Show Ko 'to!: The Michael V. Concert (2005)
 Bitoy's SHOwwwTIME Grand Showdown (2009–2010)
 Bubble Gang 10th Anniversary Special (2005)
 Bungalow: The Bubble Gang 15th Anniversary Movie Special (October 29, 2010)
 Camera Juan Documentary Special (April 21, 2013)
 Celebrity Duets Grand Finals Night (2007–2009)
 Charice: One for the Heart (February 2012)
 Charice Home For Valentine's TV Special (February 13, 2011)
 Charice One for the Heart Valentine's TV Special (February 12, 2012)
 Christmas Midnight Mass and Urbi Et Orbi Message at the Vatican (LIVE Telecast Dec. 25 1993–1995, Delayed Telecast 2000) (December 25, 1993–December 25, 2020)
 Coca Cola's Ride To Fame: Yes To Your Dreams! Grand Finals (2007)
 Codename: Asero Behind The Scenes Special: The Dubai-Manila Journeys (2008)
 Codename: Asero Farewell TV Special (November 14, 2008)
 CoLove Live TV Concert (February 29, 2020)
 Come and Get Me: Aljur Abrenica Concert Special (November 24, 2013)
 Dantes Peak: The Dingdong Dantes Birthday TV Special (August 30, 2009)
 Danz Showdown Grand Finals (October 1, 2010)
 Darna Mania: The Making of Darna '09 TV Series (August 9, 2009)
 Debate 2019: The GMA Senatorial Face-Off (February 9, 2019)
 Dingdong & Marian Wedding Special (January 17–24, 2015)
 Diz Iz It!: The Final Showdown TV Special (July 24, 2010)
 Dolphy Alay Tawa: A Musical Tribute to the King of Philippine Comedy (in cooperation with ABS-CBN and TV5, September 30, 2012)
 Drawn: Regine Velasquez Concert (2001)
 Dose Na! Bubble Gang The Movie for TV (2007, re-aired April 9–10, 2009)
 Easter Sunday Mass and Urbi Et Orbi Message at the Vatican (delayed telecast) (1996–ongoing)
 Eat Bulaga! Ang Bagong Bahay ng Eat Bulaga! (December 8, 2018)
 Eat Bulaga! Silver Special (November 27–29, 2004)
 Eat Bulaga!: Sa Tamang Panahon @ Philippine Arena (October 24, 2015)
 Eat... Bulaga!: The Moving (January 28, 1995)
 EDSA 25: Dahil Tayo'y Pilipino Special Coverage (February 25, 2011)
 Ely Buendia XL-Xtra Live at 40: The Ely Buendia 40th Birthday TV Special (December 12, 2010)
 Emmy Awards TV Special (1974–1987)
 Eraserheads The Reunion Concert 2009 The Final Set TV Special (April 5, 2009)
 Fearless: Jonalyn Viray's Concert TV Special (April 20, 2014)
 For the Love of Mama (February 28, 2016)
 Forever After: Regine Velasquez and Ogie Alcasid Fantaconcierto (2007)
 Gary V, By Kids' Request (December 14, 1997)
 GMA Flash Report: Pres. Aquino's Televised Speech on the Disbursement Acceleration Program (October 30, 2013)
 GMA Network Center's Inauguration Special (June 17, 2000)
 GMA News Live Breaking News: 9/11 Attack Special Coverage (September 11–16, 2001)
 GMA Telecine Bahaghari Awards (1993–1997)
 Gagambino's Web: The Making Of Gagambino (October 19, 2008)
 Gary V. Shout Concert TV Special (1995)
 Glaiza de Castro: Dreams Never End The Concert (November 8, 2015)
 Golden Globe Awards TV Special (1974–1991)
 Grammy Awards TV Special (1979–1997)
 Ground Zero: Sa Gitna ng Nagbabagang Mundo, The GMA News & Public Affairs Documentary Special (May 1, 2011)
 Gusto Kong Maging Pangulo (July 26, 2009)
 Ito ang Simula: The Lacson-Sotto Tandem Official Launch (September 8, 2021; simulcast on GTV, Heart of Asia, and I Heart Movies)
 Hologram: The Julie Anne San Jose Concert TV Special (February 15, 2015)
 I Do Times Two: The Jolina Magdangal-Mark Escueta Wedding Special (December 4, 2011)
 Imagine You and Me: The Journey (produced by TAPE Inc., July 9, 2016)
 Imbestigador: Bantay Kaban ng Bayan: The GMA News and Public Affairs Special Report (September 15, 2013)
 IMBG20: Bubble Gang 20th Anniversary Documentary Special (November 27, 2015)
 In Control Concert TV Special (November 27, 2016)
 Iraq: Sa Bingit Ng Digmaan: A GMA News & Public Affairs Documentary Special (2003)
 Isang Tanong: The GMA News & Public Affairs Presidential Forum (October 25, 2009)
 Isang Tanong: The GMA News & Public Affairs Senatorial Forum (January 21, 2007)
 Isang Tanong: The GMA News & Public Affairs Vice-Presidential Forum (January 17, 2010)
 Isla with Mikael and Solenn: The GMA News & Public Affairs Summer Special (May 11, 2014)
 It's My Time Concert TV Special (July 28, 2013)
 Jaya 25 Concert TV Special (February 8, 2015)
 Jennylyn Mercado: I Am Woman Concert TV Special (August 9, 2009)
 Joaquin Bordado Farewell TV Special (July 11, 2008)
 José Rizal: Ang Buhay ng Isang Bayani (December 30, 1996)
 Julie Sings the Divas (December 8, 2019)
 Kalam: Usapin ng Seguridad sa Pagkain – A GMA News & Public Affairs Documentary Special (July 6, 2008)
 King of the Ring Homecoming: The Manny Pacquiao Victory Party TV Special (March 22, 2010)
 Kitchen Superstar The Final Showdown TV Special (July 1, 2011)
 Kwentong Dabarkads (30 Dekada ng Eat Bulaga!) (October 16, 2011)
 Kyla: Not your Ordinary Girl (2004)
 La Tomatina Festival Special: The GMA News and Public Affairs Documentary Special (October 27, 2019)
 Landas: The GMA News and Public Affairs Election Docu-Movie Special (May 5, 2013)
 Lazada 11.11 Super Show (November 10, 2020)
 Let's Celebrate: The Dingdong-Marian Birthday Blowout (August 31, 2008)
 Limang Dekada: The GMA News 50th Anniversary Documentary Special (January 10, 2010)
 Love Finally: The Heart & Chiz Wedding TV Special (March 14, 2015)
 MTV Video Music Awards TV Special (1984–1987)
 Madonna: Rebel Heart Tour (November 11, 2018)
 Marcos Gold: Probe Special (1988)
 MariMar, Ang Pagbabalik... Awww!! (2007)
 MariMar: Isang Pasasalamat, Farewell Party (March 9, 2008)
 MariMar Memories TV Special (March 16, 2008)
 Martin Nievera Airbourne Concert TV Special (1992)
 Metropop Song Festival (1996–2003)
 Metropop Star Search (1997–2000)
 Michael Bublé Christmas Special (December 17, 2011)
 Michael Jackson Dangerous Live in Manila (1996)
 Miss Asia Quest (1983)
 Miss Earth 2018 (November 4, 2018)
 Miss Millennial Philippines 2017 Grand Coronation Day (September 30, 2017)
 Miss Millennial Philippines 2018 Grand Coronation Day (October 27, 2018)
 Miss Millennial Philippines 2019 Grand Coronation Day (October 26, 2019)
 Miss Resorts World Manila Grand Coronation Night TV Special (January 30, 2011; January 26, 2014)
 Miss Supranational 2013 (October 27, 2013)
 Miss Teen USA Pageant (1983–1992)
 Miss Universe Pageant (1976–1993; 2017)¹
 Miss Universe Philippines  (2020-2023)
 Miss USA Pageant (1964–1982)
 Miss World (2011; 2013–2019)
 Miss World Philippines Grand Coronation Night (2011; 2013–2019)
 Missing You: The Martin & Pops Valentines Reunion Concert 2009 (March 8, 2009)
 Mr. and Mrs. A: Regine Velasquez and Ogie Alcasid Valentine Concert (March 3, 2012)
 One Enchanting Songbird: The Regine Velasquez Concert for the benefit of GMA Kapuso Foundation (2003)
 Mutya ng Pilipinas Grand Coronation Night (1998–2003)
 My Special Love: #BoBrey in Concert (May 26, 2019)
 Nuts Entertainment Holiday Drama Special (December 26, 2008)
 Newsmakers – A GMA News & Public Affairs Documentary Special (September 28, 2008)
 New Year's Day Mass in celebration of World Peace Day at the Vatican (LIVE Telecast Dec. 25 1993-1995, Delayed Telecast 2000-) (December 25, 1993–ongoing) Ogie Twenty-Twenty: The Ogie Alcasid 20th Anniversary Concert TV Special (October 12, 2008)
 One Earth, One Journey – An Earth Day Special (April 18, 2010)
 One More Try: My Husband's Lover Thanksgiving Concert Special (October 20, 2013)
 Oras Na! (SNBO) (November 20, 2011)
 PDu30 @ 100: The GMA News & Public Affairs Special Report (SNBO) (October 9, 2016)
 Pacmania: Welcome Sa Pambansang Kapuso TV Special (May 8, 2009)
 Pacquiao Forever: A Hero Homecoming TV Special (December 12, 2012)
 Pacquiao Vs. Marquez 3 Press Conference Manila Leg TV Special (September 3, 2011)
 Pagsibol ng Pag-Asa: Japan Tsunami 1st Anniversary Special (March 11, 2012)
 Pamana: Saving Our Heritage (June 23, 2019)
 Pangarap Kong Pasko: The 700 Club Christmas Teledrama Special (December 25, 1994)
 Paninindigan: A GMA News & Public Affairs Documentary Special (April 7–14, 2013)
 Party Pilipinas Exclusive Invites: The Making of Party Pilipinas (March 27, 2010)
 Piging: Jose Rizal's 150th Birth Anniversary: The GMA News & Public Affairs Food Documentary Special (June 19, 2011)
 PiliPinas Debates 2016: The Presidential Town Hall Debates - Mindanao leg (February 21, 2016)
 Pinoy Idol Grand Finale (August 16–17, 2008)
 Pinoy Pop Superstar Grand Finals (2005–2007)
 Piso Para Sa Pasig Concert (1996–1999)
 Pitong Panalo Ni Pacquiao: The Pacquiao Victory Party TV Special (November 20, 2009)
 Planet Philippines Documentary Special (September 6, 2009, re-aired April 1, 2010)
 Prankista with Boy2 Quizon (2011)
 The Promise: Donita Rose-Eric Villarama Wedding TV Special (June 22, 2003) 
 Protégé The Final Battle Grand Finals (December 18, 2011)
 Protégé Season 2 The Final Battle Grand Finals (October 21, 2012)
 Pure Donna TV Special (1997)
 Queens On Fire: The Regine Velasquez and Pops Fernandez Concert (2005)
 R: A Regine TV Special (1996)
 R15: Regine Velasquez 15th Anniversary Concert (May 2001)
 R3.0: The Regine Velasquez-Alcasid 30th Anniversary Concert TV Special (February 18–25, 2018)
 Rachelle Ann Go: The Sendoff Concert (March 16, 2014)
 Regine Most Requested Concert (November 21, 2010)
 Regine Roots to Riches (May 24, 2009)
 Reigning Still: Regine Velasquez Concert (2005)
 Reflections Regine Velasquez Concert (2006)
 Report Card: Antas Ng Edukasyon Sa Pilipinas: The GMA News & Public Affairs Documentary Special (July 31, 2011)
 Rise Against Gravity: Rachelle Ann Go Live Concert (December 2, 2012)
 Ruffa Gutierrez and Ylmaz Bektas Wedding TV Special (July 2003)
 Saint John Paul II We Love You: The Canonization of John Paul II and John XXIII: A GMA News Special Coverage (April 25–27, 2014)
 Saksi sa Kalsada: The GMA News Special Coverage (January 19–20, 2001)
 Saksi sa Kasaysayan: A GMA News & Public Affairs Documentary Special (January 28, 2001)
 Salamat Cory (August 1–5, 2009)
 Sa Serbisyong Totoo, Nabago ang Buhay Ko: The GMA Public Affairs 30th Anniversary Documentary Special (June 25, 2017)
 SOP Music Awards (2004–2005, 2007)
 SOP PasiklaBAND Awards (2006, 2008)
 Search for a Star Grand Finals Night (March 13, 2004)
 SNBO Concert Specials (February 8–22, 2015)
 Sergio & MariMar The Wedding: MariMar Farewell TV Special (March 14, 2008)
 Show Me Da Party: Manny Pacquiao Victory Party Special (November 21, 2010)
 Si PNoy at ang Pinoy (October 24, 2010)
 Signos: Ang Banta ng Bagong Klima – A GMA News & Public Affairs Documentary Special (April 20, 2008, re-aired April 11, 2009)
 Silver: The Regine Velasquez-Alcasid 25th Anniversary Concert TV Special (January 27, 2013)
 Sisid: A GMA News & Public Affairs Documentary Special (November 29, 2008)
 Songbird Sings For The River: Muling Aawit Ang Pasig Year 4 Concert Special (1999)
 Songbird Sings Legrand Regine Velasquez and Michel Legrand Concert (2003)
 StarStruck The Final Judgment (2004–2007, 2010, 2015, 2019)
 StarStruck Kids Final Judgement Night (June 26, 2004)
 StarStruck Strikes Back TV Special (November 8, 2009)
 Stealing Minds: Bearwin Meily Magic Special (March 23, 2008)
 Sunsilk's Gaganda Ang Pasko Kapuso Grand Draw TV Special (December 21, 2008)
 Survivor Philippines: The Finale (December 12, 2008)
 Survivor Philippines: Reunion Special (December 14, 2008)
 Survivor Philippines: Palau Finale (November 13, 2009)
 Survivor Philippines: Palau Reunion Special (November 15, 2009)
 Survivor Philippines: Celebrity Showdown Live Finale (December 3, 2010)
 Survivor Philippines: Celebrity Showdown The Final Showdown (December 5, 2010)
 Survivor Philippines: Celebrity Doubles Showdown Live Finale (February 10, 2012)
 Survivor Philippines: Celebrity Doubles Showdown Reunion Special (February 19, 2012)
 Summer Sarap: A GMA News & Public Affairs Summer Documentary Special (May 17, 2009)
 Summer Squad Goals: The GMA News and Public Affairs Summer Documentary Special (May 19, 2019)
 T.G.I. X-Mas: The TGIS Christmas TV Special (December 21, 1997)
 Tala: The Film Concert TV Special (July 18, 2021)
 Tanduay Rhum Rockfest Year 5 Concert Special (October 23, 2011)
 Tanduay Rhum Rockfest Year 7 Concert Special (November 10, 2013)
 Tanghalan ng Kampeon Grand Finals Night (1987–1993)
 That's: The Reunion TV Special (January 7, 1996)
 The Best of Pinoy Meets World (January 25, 2009)
 The Clash Final Showdown Grand Finals Night TV Special (October 7, 2018)
 The Jessica Soho Presidential Interviews (January 22, 2022)
 The Making of Kaos Musical Play (January 30, 2011)
 The Making of Priscilla: Queen of the Desert Musical Play (January 26, 2014)
 The Making of GMA Christmas Short Films (2006–2012)
 The Master Showman's Final Bow (February 26, 2016)
 The Misadventures of Maverick & Ariel Show Special (March 22, 2008)
 The Pope in Manila: GMA The Official Coverage (January 10–15, 1995)
 The President on Trial: The GMA News Special Coverage (December 11, 2000 – January 18, 2001)
 The Probe Team: Ano Ating Kwento (Huling Kabanata) (December 7, 2003)
 The Royal Wedding: GMA Special Coverage (April 29, 2011)
 The Songbird & The Songwriter: Regine Velasquez & Ogie Alcasid Concert (2005)
 The Will To Win Grand Finals TV Special (May 2–4, 2018)
 Thou Shalt Not Blink (March 22, 2008, re-aired April 9, 2009)
 Tibay ng Pusong Pilipino: A GMA Telethon for the Victims of Typhoon Yolanda (November 17, 2013)
 Tina Turner: Wildest Dream Tour Concert (December 27, 1997)
 Together at Last, Rejoice (1990)
 Towering Power: A Musical Dedication: The GMA Tower of Power Launching (November 7, 1988)
 To Tell The World: World Youth Day Manila Documentary Special (January 22, 1995)
 Toyota Christmas Special (December 23, 1992)
 Totoy Bato: The Main Event TV Special (July 3, 2009)
 Tournament of Roses TV Special (1976–2002)
 A Tribute to Dolphy (December 1984)
 Tribute To No. 1 TV Special (1991)
 Trip ni Kris (April 9, 2017)
 Twenty: The Regine Velasquez 20th Anniversary Concert Special (2006)
 Tribute to Rogelio de la Rosa (December 31, 1982)
 [[Ultimate: Regine Velasquez, Martin Nievera, Lani Misalucha and Gary Valenciano Concert|]] (2015)
 Vilma Santos: 25th Anniversary in the Showbiz TV Special (November 13, 1987)
 Voices of Love: Martin Nievera and Regine Velasquez-Alcasid's Valentine Concert TV Special (February 23, 2014)
 Votebook: The GMA News And Public Affairs Documentary TV Special (May 2, 2010)
 Walang Pera?: A GMA News & Public Affairs Global Recession Documentary Special (March 22, 2009)
 Wildlife for Sale- A GMA News & Public Affairs Documentary Special (July 25, 2010)
 Where Love Reigns (The Ogie Alcasid Birthday Special) (October 16, 2011)
 Walang Unli-Rice (October 7, 2018)
 Wildlife For Sale (July 25, 2010)
 Worldview Presents: Si Barack at si Juan (2009)
 Worldview Presents: Think Positive (2009)
 Worldview Presents: Sulyap Sa Likod ng Abaya (2009)
 Worldview Presents: The Pandermic Scare (July 5, 2009)
 World Meeting of Families Manila (January 22–26, 2003)
 Your Window to the World: Citynet 27's 1st Anniversary TV Special (October 6, 1996)
 Zorro Ang Pinagmulan: The Making of Zorro TV Series (March 20, 2009)

¹in cooperation with Solar Entertainment

Christmas specials
 Christmas Where You Belong: The 1991 GMA Christmas Special (December 1991)
 Love in December: The 1995 GMA Christmas Special (December 1995)
 Regine A Christmas Wish: The Regine Velasquez Christmas Special (December 1996)
 Christmas Promdi Heart: The 1997 GMA Christmas Special (December 28, 1997)
 Happy Merry Christmas: The 1998 GMA Christmas Special (December 19, 1998) 
 A Christmas Star: The 2000 GMA Christmas Special (December 24, 2000)
 Back to Back to Christmas: The 2002 GMA Christmas Special (December 15, 2002)
 A Joli(na) Christmas Special: The Jolina Magdangal Christmas Special (December 19, 2002)
 Salu-Salo Christmas: The 2003 GMA Christmas Special (December 21, 2003)
 Kapuso Na, Kapasko Pa: The 2004 GMA Christmas Special (December 19, 2004)
 A Telefantastic Christmas: The 2005 GMA Christmas Special (December 18, 2005)
 Ang Sarap Ng Paskong Kapuso: The 2006 GMA Christmas Special (December 17, 2006)
 Sing For Me: The 2007 GMA Christmas Choir Special (December 15, 2007)
 Have Yourself A Funny Merry Christmas: The 2008 GMA Christmas Special (December 14, 2008)
 After The Rain: A Hopeful Christmas with Regine: The 2009 GMA Christmas Special (December 13, 2009)
 Himig ng Pasko: The 2014 GMA Christmas Musical Drama Special (December 14, 2014)
 The Magic of Christmas: The 2016 GMA Christmas Special (December 18, 2016)
 Paskong Kapuso: The 2017 GMA Christmas Special (December 17, 2017)
 Puso ng Pasko: The 2018 GMA Christmas Special (December 16, 2018)
 Shopee 11.11 Big Christmas TV Special (November 10, 2019)
 Shopee 12.12 Big Christmas TV Special (December 12, 2020)
 The Clash Christmas Special: Pasko Para Sa Lahat (December 25, 2020)
 Paskong Pangarap: The 2021 GMA Christmas Special feat. The Clash (December 25, 2021)

Year-end specials
 Images of 1991: The GMA News and Public Affairs Year-end Special (January 2, 1992)
 The GMA 1994 Report with Raffy Marcelo: The GMA News and Public Affairs Year-end Special (January 1, 1995)
 The GMA 1995 Report with Cheche Lazaro: The GMA News and Public Affairs Year-end Special (December 31, 1995)
 Pulitika, Pelikula, Atbp.: The GMA News and Public Affairs Year-end Special (December 28, 2003)
 24 sa 2004: The GMA News and Public Affairs Year-end Report (December 26, 2004)
 Wagi at Hindi Awards 2005: The GMA News and Public Affairs Year-end Special (January 1, 2006)
 MIB: Mga Ingay ng Bayan 2006: The GMA News and Public Affairs Year-ender (December 30, 2006)
 Strong Words: The GMA News and Public Affairs Year-ender (December 30, 2007)
 Versus: The GMA News and Public Affairs Year-ender (December 28, 2008)
 Biyaheng 2010: The GMA News and Public Affairs Year-ender Special (December 27, 2009)
 Imbestigasyon 2010: The GMA News and Public Affairs Year-End Special (January 1, 2011)
 Trending 2011: The GMA News and Public Affairs Year-ender (December 31, 2011)
 Agaw-Eksena 2012: The GMA News and Public Affairs Year-ender Special (December 23 & 30, 2012)
 Look Up, Look Up: 2013 GMA News and Public Affairs Year-End Review (December 29, 2013)
 Throwback 2014: The GMA News & Public Affairs Year-ender (December 27, 2014)
 Baliktanaw 2015: Reporter's Notebook Year-End Special (December 31, 2015)
 Year of the Superhero: The GMA News and Public Affairs 2021 Year-end Special (January 1, 2022)

New Year specials
 New Year at GMA (December 31, 1978 – January 1, 1996)
 Bantay Emergency The 1996 Year End Live Coverage (December 31, 1996 – January 1, 1997)
 GMA Ayala Millennium Party / Global Millennium Day Broadcast (December 31, 1999 – January 1, 2000)
 Synchronicity: The 2001 GMA New Year's Countdown (December 31, 2000 – January 1, 2001)
 Saksi: Countdown to 2003 (December 31, 2002 – January 1, 2003)
 Countdown to '04 (December 31, 2003 – January 1, 2004)
 Jive to '05: The Kapuso Sayawan Countdown (December 31, 2004 – January 1, 2005)
 Jam to '06: The 2006 GMA New Year Countdown Special (December 31, 2005 – January 1, 2006)
 Cheers to '07: The GMA New Year Countdown (December 31, 2006 – January 1, 2007)
 Celebrate to '08: The 2008 GMA New Year Countdown Special (December 31, 2007 – January 1, 2008)
 Lucky '09: The 2009 GMA New Year Countdown Special (December 31, 2008 – January 1, 2009)
 Prosperity in 2010: The 2010 GMA New Year Countdown Special (December 31, 2009 – January 1, 2010)
 2010 to '11: The GMA New Year Countdown (December 31, 2010 – January 1, 2011)
 Countdown to 2012: The GMA New Year Special (December 31, 2011 – January 1, 2012)
 Win na Win sa 2013: : The 2013 GMA New Year Countdown Special (December 31, 2012 – January 1, 2013)
 Countdown to 2014: The GMA New Year Special (December 31, 2013 – January 1, 2014)
 Countdown to 2015: The GMA New Year Special (December 31, 2014 – January 1, 2015)
 Countdown to 2016: The GMA New Year Special (December 31, 2015 – January 1, 2016)
 Lipad sa 2017: The 2017 Kapuso New Year Countdown Special (December 31, 2016 – January 1, 2017)
 2018 GMA New Year Countdown: Buong Puso Para sa Kapuso (December 31, 2017 – January 1, 2018)
 2019 GMA New Year Countdown: The GMA New Year Special (December 31, 2018 – January 1, 2019)
 Kapuso Countdown to 2020: The GMA New Year Special (December 31, 2019 – January 1, 2020)
 Kapuso Countdown to 2021: The GMA New Year Special (December 31, 2020 – January 1, 2021)
 Kapuso Countdown to 2022: The GMA New Year Special (December 31, 2021 – January 1, 2022)
 Kapuso Countdown to 2023 Gayo Daejeon (December 31, 2022 – January 1, 2023; in Partnership with SBS)

Holy Week specials
 #MichaelAngelo Lenten Special (2018–2019)
 1/2 (April 20, 2019)
 3/3 (April 19, 2019)
 50/50 (April 18, 2019)
 Birthday (March 30, 2018)
 Kulay (March 29, 2018)
 Lagas (March 31, 2018)
 #MichaelAngelo Holy Week Reflections (April 18–20, 2019)
 Ang Forever Ko'y Ikaw Holy Week Marathon (March 29, 2018)
 Ang Kasagutan (produced by Billy Graham Evangelistic Association, 2007)
 Angel Villa (produced by APT Entertainment, April 10, 2004)
 Anghel sa Lupa (produced by APT Entertainment, April 3, 2010)
 Banal na Paglalakbay sa Yapak ni Hesukristo: Pilgrimage to Holy Land TV Special (Produced by Steve 'O Neal Productions, April 17, 2014)
  Ben-Hur (produced and licensed by Metro-Goldwyn-Mayer, April 16, 2022)
 Bilanggo (2000; re-aired 2008)
 Biyahe Ni Drew Holy Week Documentary Specials (2022)
 Bo Sanchez Lenten Special (produced by Kerygma TV & Shepherds Voice, Inc., 2005)
 CBN Asia Holy Week Special (produced by CBN Asia, Inc., 1995)
 Eat Bulaga Lenten Drama Specials (produced by TAPE Inc. 1995–2008, 2014–present)
 A Daughter's Love (March 27, 2018)
 Alalay (April 6, 2004)
 Ama't Anak (April 5, 2004)
 Ang Mga Anak Ng Maestro (March 19, 2008, re-aired 2009)
 Angel (April 7, 2004)
 Anyo ng Pag-Ibig (April 16, 2014)
 Aruga Ng Puso (April 1, 2015)
 Bakit Naman Ako Pa? (April 10, 1995)
 Binhi Sa Matabang Lupa (April 3, 2007, re-aired April 12, 2022)
 Biyaheng Broken Hearted (April 16, 2019)
 Biro Ng Kapalaran (March 30, 2015)
 Bulawan (April 15, 2019)
 Dalangin Ng Ama (March 21, 2016)
 Ganyan Kita Kamahal (April 12, 2006, re-aired 2009 and 2013)
 God Gave Me You (March 23, 2016)
 Hakbang sa Pangarap (April 15, 2014)
 Haligi ng Pangarap (March 26, 2018)
 Hating Kapatid (March 28, 2018)
 Ikigai: Ang Buhay Ng Buhay Ko (April 17, 2019)
 Ilaw ng Kahapon (April 14, 2014)
 Inay (April 10, 2017)
 Kaibigan (April 12, 2017)
 Kapatid (April 10, 2017)
 Kaputol Ng Buhay (March 21, 2016)
 Karugtong ng Puso (April 14, 2014)
 Kulungan Kanlungan (April 15, 2014)
 Lukso Ng Dugo (March 31, 2015)
 Mama (April 10, 2006)
 Mansyon (April 12, 2017)
 Mga Ginoong Marya (March 24, 1997)
 My Carinderia Girl (March 26, 2018)
 Pagpapatawad (April 11, 2017)
 Pamilya (March 27, 2018)
 Panata (March 22, 2016)
 Pangako Ng Pag-Ibig (March 30, 2015)
 Pangalawang Bukas (April 16, 2014, re-aired April 13, 2022)
 Perfect (March 21, 2005)
 Pinagpalang Ama (March 31, 2015)
 Prinsesa (April 11, 2017)
 Sa Iyong Paglaya (April 2, 2007)
 Sino Ang Bestfriend Ko? (April 11, 2001)
 Star (April 4, 2007, re-aired April 11, 2022)
 Sukli Ng Pagmamahal (April 1, 2015)
 Tahanan (March 23, 2005, re-aired 2013)
 Taray ni Tatay (March 28, 2018)
 True Love (March 22, 2005)
 The Manager (2003, re-aired 2009 and 2013)
 Waiting Room (April 11, 2006)
 Walang Kapalit (March 22, 2016)
 Elehiya (produced by APT Entertainment, March 31, 2018)
 Family Bible Quiz Show (2009)
 Fiesta: Ang Makulay na Pananampalatayang Pilipino (produced by Jesuit Communications Foundation, April 3, 2021)
 First Time Holy Week Marathon (April 1–3, 2010)
 First Yaya Holy Week Marathon (April 2–3, 2021)
 Forgiven: Kerygma TV Lenten Documentary Special (produced by Kerygma TV & Shepherd's Voice, Inc., March 26, 2016)
 Francis: The Pope from the New World (March 25, 2016)
 GMA Telecine Holy Week Specials (2007–2008)
 GenRev: Generation Revival (produced by Elim Foundation, Inc., 2006)
 Gideon 300's The Seven Last Words (1990–2000)
 Gulong: A CBN Asia Holy Week Special (produced by CBN Asia, Inc., 2010)
 Huli't Simula: Kerygma TV Holy Week Special (produced by Kerygma TV & Shepherd's Voice, Inc., March 31, 2018)
 I Can See You: Love on the Balcony Marathon (April 1, 2021)
 Ignacio de Loyola (2018)
 Jesus (March 30, 2018)
 Jesus of Nazareth (1986, re-aired 1989, 1990)
 Jesus: His Life (April 9–11, 2020, re-aired April 1–3, 2021)
 Kambal Karibal Holy Week Marathon (March 29–30, 2018)
 Kristo (1998, re-aired 1999)
 Lamat Sa Puso: A CBN Holy Week Special (produced by CBN Asia, Inc., 1999, re-aired 2008)
 Larawan Holy Week Special (2004)
 Lunch Date Lenten Drama Specials (1988–1992)
 Maestra (produced by APT Entertainment, April 23, 2011)
 Manaoag: The Call of the Virgin (2010)
 Marcelino (produced by APT Entertainment, April 22, 2000)
 May Himala Holy Week Special (2003–2009)
 May Milagroso pa nga ba? (produced by APT Entertainment, March 30, 2002)
 Milagroso (produced by APT Entertainment, April 15, 2006)
 Mundo Mo'y Akin Holy Week Marathon (2013)
 Obra Holy We specialsk Special (2010)
 One Piece TV Movie: Luffy's Detective Story (April 19, 2014)
 Pag-Uwi (produced by APT Entertainment, April 4, 2015)
 Pagsubok (produced by APT Entertainment, March 26, 2016)
 Panalangin (produced by APT Entertainment, April 19, 2014)
 Pari Koy Holy Week Marathon (2015)
 PY Nakar Holy Week Special (produced by Elim Foundation, Inc., 2005)
 Perpetua (produced by APT Entertainment, March 30, 2013)
 Pokémon CVA 1: Pokémon's Ghost (April 19, 2014)
 Pikachu Summer's Festival (April 18, 2014)
 Pinagpala Sa Babaeng Lahat (produced by APT Entertainment, April 7, 2012)
 Power to Unite with Elvira Holy Week Special (2012–present) (continues airing on IBC, TV5, TV Maria and DZRH News Television)
 Preacher in Blue Jeans (produced by Kerygma TV & Shepherd's Voice, Inc., 2006)
 Rebound (2008)
 Sahaya Holy Week Marathon Special (April 18, 2019)
 Sa Kandungan Ng Langit (2005)
 Sa Kamay ng Diyos (produced by APT Entertainment, March 26, 2005)
 Sa Mata Ng Simbahan (produced by Media Vessel Productions, March 24, 2016)
 SST Lenten Drama Specials (1993–1994)
 Selda 1430 (produced by APT Entertainment, April 15, 2017)
 Sa Ngalan Ng Anak: A CBN Holy Week Special (produced by CBN Asia, Inc., 2006)
 Sentenciada (produced by APT Entertainment, March 23, 2008)
 Siete Palabras (produced by Dominican Province of the Philippines, 2009–present, simulcast over Radio Veritas)
 Siyang Pinagpala, Isa pang Awit ni Bernadette (produced by APT Entertainment, April 14, 2001)
 Son of God (produced and licensed by Metro-Goldwyn-Mayer (LightWorkers Media), March 24, 2016, April 13, 2017, April 10, 2020)
 Spartacus (produced and licensed by Universal Pictures, April 14, 2022)
 Stories for the Soul Holy Week Lenten Special (March 30, 2018; April 18–19, 2019)
 Sugat ng Kahapon (produced by APT Entertainment, April 11, 2009)
 Tanikala: Ama Namin (produced by CBN Asia, Inc., March 29, 2013)
 Tanikala: Ang Ikalawang Libro (produced by CBN Asia, Inc., 2010)
 Tanikala: Bihag ng Kadiliman (produced by CBN Asia, Inc., 2009)
 Tanikala: Buyonero (produced by CBN Asia, Inc., March 25, 2016; re-aired April 18, 2019)
 Tanikala: Habang May Ngayon (produced by CBN Asia, Inc., April 1, 2021)
 Tanikala: Hatol (produced by CBN Asia, Inc., April 18, 2014)
 Tanikala: Isa Pang Hiling (produced by CBN Asia, Inc., April 2, 2021)
 Tanikala: It’s Un-Pair: Pramis, Trulaloong Labstory Itoh! (produced by CBN Asia, Inc., March 29, 2018)
 Tanikala: Kublihan (produced by CBN Asia, Inc., April 19, 2019)
 Tanikala: Kulam (produced by CBN Asia, Inc., April 21, 2011)
 Tanikala: Liwanag sa Dapithapon (produced by CBN Asia, Inc., March 28, 2013, re-aired April 19, 2014)
 Tanikala: My Sister, My Lover (produced by CBN Asia, Inc., April 17, 2014, re-aired April 4, 2015)
 Tanikala: Nuno (produced by CBN Asia, Inc., April 14, 2017; re-aired March 31, 2018)
 Tanikala: Paghilom (produced by CBN Asia, Inc., April 15, 2022)
 Tanikala: Panata (produced by CBN Asia, Inc., April 23, 2011)
 Tanikala: Pilat sa Musmos Kong Alaala (produced by CBN Asia, Inc., March 30, 2018)
 Tanikala: Sa Isang Iglap (produced by CBN Asia, Inc., April 2, 2015; re-aired March 25, 2016)
 Tanikala: Sais-Katorse (produced by CBN Asia, Inc., April 13, 2017; re-aired March 31, 2018)
 Tanikala: Suklob (produced by CBN Asia, Inc., April 10, 2020)
 Tanikala: Tugon sa Dalangin (produced by CBN Asia, Inc., April 14, 2022)
 Tanikala: Unos (produced by CBN Asia, Inc., April 6, 2012)
 Tanikala: Wasak (produced by CBN Asia, Inc., April 22, 2011, re-aired April 7, 2012, April 15, 2017)
 Tanikala: Wanda's Wonderful World (produced by CBN Asia, Inc., April 9, 2020)
 Tatlong Araw: Kerygma TV Holy Week Special (produced by Kerygma TV & Shepherd's Voice, Inc., April 15, 2017)
 The Ark Movie (Tagalog Dub) (2018)
 The Best of Front Row (yearly, until 2019)
 The Best of I-Witness (yearly)
 The Best of Kapuso Mo, Jessica Soho (yearly)
 The Best of Reporter's Notebook (yearly)
 The Best of Wish Ko Lang (yearly)
 The 8th Word (produced by Kerygma TV and Shepherd's Voice, Inc., 2013)
 The Journey (produced by APT Entertainment, April 20, 2019)
 The Score (produced by Billy Graham Evangelistic Association, 2007, re-aired 2008)
 The Story of Jesus For Children (Tagalog dub) (March 30, 2018)
 The Ten Commandments (produced and licensed by Paramount Pictures, 2015–2018, 2020–present)
 Unico Hijo (produced by APT Entertainment, April 7, 2007)
 Via Cruses (produced by APT Entertainment, April 19, 2003)
 Way of the Cross at Rome'' (Delayed telecast) (2009–present)

See also
List of programs broadcast by GMA Network
List of programs aired by GMA Network

References

 
GMA Network specials